Finger rafting develops in an ice cover as a result of a compression regime established within the plane of the ice. As two expanses of sea ice converge toward another, one of them slides smoothly on top of the other (it is overthrusted) along a given distance, resulting in a local increase in ice thickness. The term finger rafting refers to the systematic alternation of interlocking overthrusts and underthrusts involved in this process. Such a pattern derives its name from its resemblance to the interlocking of fingers.

The process 
Rafting, also called telescoped ice, is most noticeable when it involves new and young ice, but also occurs in ice of all thicknesses. The process of finger rafting as such is commonly observed inside a lead, once a thin layer of ice (at the nilas stage) has formed. Although this ice is typically very weak (it is unable to support its own weight outside the water), it contains a lot of brine and is also relatively warm, since being that thin, its temperature is near that of the water. Rafting is accompanied with rapid draining of the brine inside the overlying ice sheet. This brine acts as a lubricant, significantly reducing the friction between the two sheets during overthrusting.

Rafting versus ridging 
Rafting and ridging are two possible responses expected from the interaction between two converging ice sheets or floes. The term 'ridging' refers to the process of ridge formation, involving the breaking up of the ice sheet into distinct blocks (which does not happen during rafting). The reason why breaking happens is that, as the ice thickness increases, the bending moment exerted on the upper surface of the ice exceeds its tensile strength. In other words, the ice is no longer flexible enough to withstand the overthrust event without breaking.

Maximum thickness for rafting 
A theoretical formula has been used to estimate the maximum thickness an ice sheet can have in order to be able to raft. This thickness is

where  is Poisson's ratio,  is the tensile strength of the ice,  is water density, Y is the Young's modulus of sea ice and g is the gravitational acceleration.

See also 
 Lead (sea ice)
 Pressure ridge (ice)

Notes

References

Sea ice